The Hodgkin–Huxley model, or conductance-based model, is a mathematical model that describes how action potentials in neurons are initiated and propagated. It is a set of nonlinear differential equations that approximates the electrical characteristics of excitable cells such as neurons and muscle cells. It is a continuous-time dynamical system.

Alan Hodgkin and Andrew Huxley described the model in 1952 to explain the ionic mechanisms underlying the initiation and propagation of action potentials in the squid giant axon.  They received the 1963 Nobel Prize in Physiology or Medicine for this work.

Basic components
The typical Hodgkin–Huxley model treats each component of an excitable cell as an electrical element (as shown in the figure). The lipid bilayer is represented as a capacitance (Cm). Voltage-gated ion channels are represented by electrical conductances (gn, where n is the specific ion channel) that depend on both voltage and time.  Leak channels are represented by linear conductances (gL). The electrochemical gradients driving the flow of ions are represented by voltage sources (En) whose voltages are determined by the ratio of the intra- and extracellular concentrations of the ionic species of interest. Finally, ion pumps are represented by current sources (Ip). The membrane potential is denoted by Vm.

Mathematically, the current flowing through the lipid bilayer is written as

 

and the current through a given ion channel is the product of that channel's conductance and the driving potential for the specific ion 

 

where  is the reversal potential of the specific ion channel.
Thus, for a cell with sodium and potassium channels, the total current through the membrane is given by:

  
 
where I is the total membrane current per unit area, Cm is the membrane capacitance per unit area, gK and gNa are the potassium and sodium conductances per unit area, respectively, VK  and VNa are the potassium and sodium reversal potentials, respectively, and gl and Vl are the leak conductance per unit area and leak reversal potential, respectively. The time dependent elements of this equation are Vm, gNa, and gK, where the last two conductances depend explicitly on the membrane voltage (Vm) as well.

Ionic current characterization

In voltage-gated ion channels, the channel conductance is a function of both time and voltage ( in the figure), while in leak channels, it is a constant ( in the figure). The current generated by ion pumps is dependent on the ionic species specific to that pump. The following sections will describe these formulations in more detail.

Voltage-gated ion channels
Using a series of voltage clamp experiments and by varying extracellular sodium and potassium concentrations, Hodgkin and Huxley developed a model in which the properties of an excitable cell are described by a set of four ordinary differential equations. Together with the equation for the total current mentioned above, these are:

 

 

 

 

For instance, given that potassium channels in squid giant axon are made up of four subunits which all need to be in the open state for the channel to allow the passage of potassium ions, the n needs to be raised to the fourth power. For ,  and  take the form

 

 

 
where  denotes the negative depolarization in mV.

While in many current software programs,

In order to characterize voltage-gated channels, the equations can be fitted to voltage clamp data. For a derivation of the Hodgkin–Huxley equations under voltage-clamp, see. Briefly, when the membrane potential is held at a constant value (i.e., with a voltage clamp), for each value of the membrane potential the nonlinear gating equations reduce to equations of the form:

 

 

 

Thus, for every value of membrane potential  the sodium and potassium currents can be described by

 

 

In order to arrive at the complete solution for a propagated action potential, one must write the current term I on the left-hand side of the first differential equation in terms of V, so that the equation becomes an equation for voltage alone. The relation between I and V can be derived from cable theory and is given by

 

where a is the radius of the axon, R is the specific resistance of the axoplasm, and x is the position along the nerve fiber. Substitution of this expression for I transforms the original set of equations into a set of partial differential equations, because the voltage becomes a function of both x and t.

The Levenberg–Marquardt algorithm is often used to fit these equations to voltage-clamp data.

While the original experiments involved only sodium and potassium channels, the Hodgkin–Huxley model can also be extended to account for other species of ion channels.

Leak channels
Leak channels account for the natural permeability of the membrane to ions and take the form of the equation for voltage-gated channels, where the conductance  is a constant.

Pumps and exchangers
The membrane potential depends upon the maintenance of ionic concentration gradients across it. The maintenance of these concentration gradients requires active transport of ionic species. The sodium-potassium and sodium-calcium exchangers are the best known of these. Some of the basic properties of the Na/Ca exchanger have already been well-established: the stoichiometry of exchange is 3 Na+: 1 Ca2+ and the exchanger is electrogenic and voltage-sensitive. The Na/K exchanger has also been described in detail, with a 3 Na+: 2 K+ stoichiometry.

Mathematical properties
The system is difficult to study because it is a nonlinear system and cannot be solved analytically. However, there are many numerical methods available to analyze the system. Certain properties and general behaviors, such as limit cycles, can be proven to exist.

Center manifold

Because there are four state variables, visualizing the path in phase space can be difficult. Usually two variables are chosen, voltage  and the potassium gating variable , allowing one to visualize the limit cycle. However, one must be careful because this is an ad-hoc method of visualizing the 4-dimensional system. This does not prove the existence of the limit cycle.

A better projection can be constructed from a careful analysis of the Jacobian of the system, evaluated at the equilibrium point. Specifically, the eigenvalues of the Jacobian are indicative of the center manifold's existence. Likewise, the eigenvectors of the Jacobian reveal the center manifold's orientation. The Hodgkin–Huxley model has two negative eigenvalues and two complex eigenvalues with slightly positive real parts. The eigenvectors associated with the two negative eigenvalues will reduce to zero as time t increases. The remaining two complex eigenvectors define the center manifold.  In other words, the 4-dimensional system collapses onto a 2-dimensional plane.  Any solution starting off the center manifold will decay towards the center manifold. Furthermore, the limit cycle is contained on the center manifold.

Bifurcations
If the injected current  were used as a bifurcation parameter, then the Hodgkin–Huxley model undergoes a Hopf bifurcation. As with most neuronal models, increasing the injected current will increase the firing rate of the neuron. One consequence of the Hopf bifurcation is that there is a minimum firing rate. This means that either the neuron is not firing at all (corresponding to zero frequency), or firing at the minimum firing rate. Because of the all-or-none principle, there is no smooth increase in action potential amplitude, but rather there is a sudden "jump" in amplitude. The resulting transition is known as a canard.

Improvements and alternative models

The Hodgkin–Huxley model is regarded as one of the great achievements of 20th-century biophysics.  Nevertheless, modern Hodgkin–Huxley-type models have been extended in several important ways:
Additional ion channel populations have been incorporated based on experimental data.
The Hodgkin–Huxley model has been modified to incorporate transition state theory and produce thermodynamic Hodgkin–Huxley models. 
Models often incorporate highly complex geometries of dendrites and axons, often based on microscopy data.
Conductance-based models similar to Hodgkin-Huxley model incorporate the knowledge about cell types defined by single cell transcriptomics.
Stochastic models of ion-channel behavior, leading to stochastic hybrid systems.
The Poisson–Nernst–Planck (PNP) model is based on a mean-field approximation of ion interactions and continuum descriptions of concentration and electrostatic potential.

Several simplified neuronal models have also been developed (such as the FitzHugh–Nagumo model), facilitating efficient large-scale simulation of groups of neurons, as well as mathematical insight into dynamics of action potential generation.

See also

Anode break excitation
Autowave
Neural circuit
Galves–Löcherbach model
GHK flux equation
Goldman equation
Memristor
Neural accommodation
Reaction–diffusion
Theta model
Rulkov map
Chialvo map

References

Further reading

External links
Interactive Javascript simulation of the HH model  Runs in any HTML5 – capable browser. Allows for changing the parameters of the model and current injection.
Interactive Java applet of the HH model  Parameters of the model can be changed as well as excitation parameters and phase space plottings of all the variables is possible.
Direct link to Hodgkin–Huxley model and a Description in BioModels Database
Neural Impulses: The Action Potential In Action by Garrett Neske, The Wolfram Demonstrations Project
Interactive Hodgkin–Huxley model by Shimon Marom, The Wolfram Demonstrations Project
ModelDB A computational neuroscience source code database containing 4 versions (in different simulators) of the original Hodgkin–Huxley model and hundreds of models that apply the Hodgkin–Huxley model to other channels in many electrically excitable cell types.
Several articles about the stochastic version of the model and its link with the original one.

Nonlinear systems
Electrophysiology
Ion channels
Computational neuroscience